William Alexander Kerr, VC (18 July 1831 – 21 May 1919) was a Scottish soldier, writer and a recipient of the Victoria Cross, the highest award for gallantry in the face of the enemy that can be awarded to British and Commonwealth forces.

Details
Kerr was a 25 year old lieutenant in the 24th Bombay Native Infantry (now 6th Battalion The Baloch Regiment, Pakistan Army) who was serving with the Southern Mahratta Horse during the Indian Mutiny, when the following deed took place on 10 July 1857 at Kolapore, India for which he was awarded the Victoria Cross (VC):

Kerr attended Loretto School. He achieved the rank of captain. His VC is on display at the Lord Ashcroft Gallery, Imperial War Museum, London.

References

External links
Location of grave and VC medal (Kent)
VC medal auction details
 

British recipients of the Victoria Cross
British East India Company Army officers
1831 births
1919 deaths
Indian Rebellion of 1857 recipients of the Victoria Cross
People educated at Loretto School, Musselburgh
People from Melrose, Scottish Borders